Franco Carraro (born 6 December 1939) is an Italian sport manager and politician.

Career 

Carraro was born on 6 December 1939 in Padua, at the time Kingdom of Italy. He worked in many high-profile roles in the public and private sectors. That was followed by the presidency of Italian association football club Milan from 1967 to 1971.

In the 1970s, Carraro worked in the Italian Football Federation (FIGC). He was president of Italy's top two football leagues, Serie A and Serie B, from 1973 to 1976, and was president of the FIGC from 1976 to 1978. On 19 May 1978, he resigned to become president of the Italian National Olympic Committee (CONI), a role he held until 1987. From 1982 to 2019, Carraro was a member of the International Olympic Committee (IOC); per IOC policy, namely an age-limit fixed at 70 years old, except for members between 1966 and 1999, for whom the age limit is 80, Carraro retired in 2019 but remains an honorary member.

The 1986 Italian football betting scandal, referred to as Totonero or Totonero bis, created a vacancy that Carraro would accept as the FIGC commissioner from 1986 to 1987. The presidency would follow that of the Italia 90 Committee, the executive committee of the 1990 FIFA World Cup. In 1994, he became president of Impregilo, the biggest pole of Italian construction. He was president of the FIGC from 1997 to 2001. He was reelected as president of the FIGC in 2001 and remained in this position until 2006. He was also a member of the UEFA executive board from 2004 to 2009.

After  left the Lega Serie A presidency to work for UniCredit in 2011, Carraro was thought as a possible successor in what would be his first football role since Calciopoli. He was immediately opposed by smaller Serie A clubs. A return to the presidency of the Major Risks Commission under then-FIGC president Carlo Tavecchio was rumoured in 2015. Nicknamed poltronissimo for the many positions held in his career, Carraro was described by journalist  thusly: "In the whole world, after Fidel Castro, Carraro is the person who has been in power the longest." In 2021, he was reelected president of the 's board of directors.

Sport scandals and controversy 
In 2001, the year he was elected FIGC president, Carraro refused to put Inter Milan on trial for the  scandal, which also involved other Serie A clubs. Lawyer Eduardo Chiacchio said: "In 2001 there was the scandal of false passports, above all that of Recoba. By the rules, Inter had to have a point-deduction for each match played with the Uruguayan player on the pitch. [Napoli president] Ferlaino asked me to take action because Moratti's Inter could be given 23 penalty points and so it was Inter and not Napoli which would be relegated." As the 2000–01 Serie A was over, the decision was on Carraro, who did not want to put Inter on trial. Chiacchio added that "Inter was saved because no one had the courage to appeal to justice. Calciopoli was just the tip of the iceberg."

Carraro was president of Mediobanca, which was owned by Capitalia and was a major investor in Seria A clubs, particularly Lazio, Parma, and Roma; Lazio and Roma went on to win the 2000 and 2001 Serie A leagues to Juventus' disadvantage. He was accused of conflict of interest, as he was co-owner of Lazio and Roma through his control of Capitalia, charges he dismissed. In 2006, it emerged that Carraro was involved in Calciopoli, the 2006 Italian football scandal, which led to his resignation; he remained on the UEFA's executive committee and as a FIFA official. He denied any wrongdoing and said he resigned in the interest of football. Charged of being part of a criminal association to steer the 2004–05 Serie A, he was acquitted in 2008. In May 2009, he was acquitted of sporting fraud due to lack of evidence.

In one telephone tapping ahead of the 2004–05 Serie A match between Inter Milan, which would benefit with the scudetto of the league at the time of the scandal but were later charged of Article 6 warrating relegation when it was time-barred by the statute of limitations, and Juventus, the sole club to be controversially relegated to Serie B, Carraro asked referee designator Paolo Bergamo to avoid any favour for Juventus if in doubt. On the matchday, Bergamo told referee  to favour Inter Milan when in doubt; the match, which ended 2–2, saw an error favouring Inter Milan. In his deposition, Carraro testified he said that because he was aware that any mistake, no matter if in good faith, favouring Juventus would cause controversy, whereas errors that disadvantaged or penalized Juventus would cause no controversy; he wanted to avoid controversy because the match came ahead of the Italian football elections. In another intercepted phone call with Bergamo, Carraro declared that Fiorentina and Lazio must be helped to avoid being relegated to Serie B. His original prison sentence was 4 years and 6 months but was later replaced by a fine of €80,000, which was controversial.

In the 2010s, Carraro expressed his criticism of the scudetto awarded to Inter Milan, especially because, as he recalled, "a month later Rossi goes to be president of Telecom for the second time, whose largest shareholder is Marco Tronchetti Provera, vice-president of Inter." He also said that Juventus were the best team and had legitimately won on the pitch. In 2020, he stated that the only thing he blamed himself for Calciopoli was not having substituted Bergamo and Pierluigi Pairetto earlier with Pierluigi Collina as referee designator, and reiterated that Juventus would still have won had the scandal not happened because they were the best team.

Politics 

As a member of the Italian Socialist Party, Carraro was the Italian minister of tourism in Giovanni Goria, Ciriaco De Mita, and Giulio Andreotti's Christian Democracy-led pentapartito governments of 1987–1991, and he was the mayor of Rome from 1989 to 1993 after being elected by the city's council. In his mayoral campaign, he was supported by actor Carlo Verdone and journalist Giuliano Ferrara.

In the 2000s and 2010s, Carraro was part of The People of Freedom, and then joined the refounded Forza Italia, the centre-right coalition political parties of Silvio Berlusconi, former Prime Minister of Italy and chairman of Milan, a club he said he continues to sympathize with. He remains politically close to Berlusconi. A member of the Senate of the Republic first elected in the 2013 Italian general election for Forza Italia, Carraro was not among the party list's candidates for the 2018 Italian general election.

In popular culture 
Carraro is the protagonist of Rome's ska-punk bank Banda Bassotti in the song "Carraro sindaco", whose text is used as criticism against him for the way he handles the city of Rome as mayor and for the possession of several houses donated to his buoi.

Explanatory notes and quotes

References

Further reading

External links 
 Olympics profile at Olympics.com (in English)
 Senate profile at Senato.it (in Italian)

1939 births
A.C. Milan chairmen and investors
Forza Italia (2013) politicians
Forza Italia (2013) senators
Members of the Senate of the Republic (Italy)
People involved in the 2006 Italian football scandal
The People of Freedom politicians
Politicians from Padua
International Olympic Committee members
Italian sports directors
Italian Socialist Party politicians
Living people
Members of the UEFA Executive Committee
Senators of Legislature XVII of Italy